Pandacan is a district in Manila, Philippines which is known in recent history for its former Pandacan oil depot which supplies the majority of oil exports in the country.

Profile
In 2000, Pandacan had a total population of close to 82,194. The original residents of the district are Tagalog migrants from the province of Bulacan. When the district grew and progressed as a manufacturing center for Manila, several ethnic groups from other parts of the country migrated into the district after the Second World War.

The district is bounded to the north and northeast by the Pasig River, the Estero de Pandacan to the west and south and the district of Santa Ana to the southeast.

Socioeconomically, the majority of the residents of Pandacan range from lower- to upper-middle class. Original residents are gainfully employed as blue-collar workers in the nearby factories and oil depots, while those in the service sector are generally employed in nearby Makati, the country's central business district.

Pandacan was originally established as the industrial center for the city of Manila during the turn of the 20th century. Oil depots which service more than half of the fuel requirement of the country were established along the banks of the Pasig River in the district.

Barangays

Zone 91: Barangays 833, 834, 835, 836, 837, 838, 839, and 840

Zone 92: Barangays 841, 842, 843, 844, 845, 846, 847, and 848

Zone 93: Barangays 849, 850, 851, 852, 853, 855, 856, 857, 858, and 859

Zone 94: Barangays 860, 861, 862, 863, 864, and 865

Zone 95: Barangays 867, 868, 869, 870, 871, and 872

Landmarks

The district is home to a few well-known historical figures, including Apolinario Mabini, one of the key figures in the Philippine fight for independence during the late 19th century against Spanish rule. The National Historical Commission of the Philippines has declared Mabini's former residence as a national historical shrine.

Former First Lady Imelda Romualdez Marcos claims Pandacan as her ancestral home in Manila. Since marrying former President Ferdinand Marcos in the 1960s, caretakers have been constantly maintaining her home. The house is Marcos' tie as a resident of Manila, despite her family's roots in Leyte province in the Visayas.

Schools
Public elementary schools serving the district includes Jacinto Zamora Elementary School, Bagong Diwa Elementary School (under construction), Beata Elementary School and Bagong Barangay Elementary School; the district has one public high school, the Carlos P. Garcia High School.

Private education is provided by a Catholic school called St. Joseph's School – Pandacan, located beside the Santo Niño Parish along Jesus Street.

In 1994, the ERDA Technical And Vocational Secondary School was built by Fr. Pierre Tritz, a Jesuit from France for the disadvantaged Filipino youth.

Churches
Four of the leading Christian religious dominations in the Philippines established their presence in the district. For Roman Catholics, there is the Santo Niño Parish along Jesus Street. The Iglesia ni Cristo and the United Methodist Church both have a church along Quirino Avenue, and the Philippine Independent Church has a church (Parish of Sto. Niño) at the corner of Central and Labores Streets.

History

Officially, Pandacan was established as a community in 1574 when Franciscan priests of the Roman Catholic Church established the first mission in the district. Pandacan was originally part of the parish of Sampaloc; it was later established as a separate parish in 1712.

Pandacan was a farming community, producing small quantities of rice and sugar that were sold to the Spanish enclave in Intramuros. Aside from a few vegetable plots, the old Pandacan produced bricks and tiles, colored cotton laces but in limited quantities. The district also produced shoes and small boats.

In the 19th century, Pandacan was described as a "Little Venice" or "Little Italy" for its numerous canals or estuaries leading to the Pasig River. Many would leisurely row through the estuaries in the late afternoons as described by Francisco Balagtas in his early writings. Pandacan was home to balladeers and a source of musicians in the early times.

Late in the Spanish era and into the American regime, Pandacan was developed into becoming the first industrial estate in the Philippines. The first modern manufacturing company was built in Pandacan and was called the Compañia General de Tabacos de Filipinas in 1882, a modern cigar-making plant.

The first stone church in Pandacan was built in 1732 by Father Francisco del Rosario. The church would take 30 years to complete. The image of the Holy Child of Jesus or popularly known as Sto. Niño was enshrined at the church and its feast is traditionally celebrated on the third Sunday of January. According to legend, the image of the Santo Niño was recovered from a well near the church and some say the water from the well resulted in the miraculous healing of the infirm. The well has long been sealed due to pollutants but a shrine stands on what was once the well.

The original church, completed in 1760, was twice destroyed by earthquakes. A modern church stood on the ruins including a parish school which stands on what was the Catholic cemetery of the district. The church was destroyed by fire on July 10, 2020.

Pandacan was home to prominent Filipino artists of the 19th century, including Francisco Baltazar (also known as Balagtas) who authored Florante at Laura; musician Ladislao Bonus; Tagalog language theorist Lope K. Santos; and playwrights Miguel Masilungan and Pantaleon Lopez.

By the turn of the 19th century, the American colonial government decreed Pandacan as the center for industrial activity and had oil companies build their storage and distribution facilities in the district.

With the presence of several manufacturing facilities in the district, a modern housing facility was built to house the workers at the nearby oil depots. The housing project was called "Kapitan Tikong" (Captain Tikong) subdivision, named after a popular local leader. The housing facility was built on the southeastern banks of the Estero de Beata. In honor of Francisco Baltazar, the streets in the subdivision were named after the characters of Florante at Laura.

Modernization

From industrial to commercial

The manufacturing facilities in Pandacan have long transferred to other locations outside of Manila. Only the major "Big Three" oil companies operate oil distribution depots in Pandacan: Royal Dutch Shell, Chevron's Caltex and San Miguel Energy Corp. majority-owned Petron Philippines.

During his second term, Manila Mayor Lito Atienza led an effort to convert Pandacan from an industrial classification into commercial, in an effort to have the oil depot removed from the district. Atienza and several city councilors were concerned that the oil depot served as a security, environment, and safety hazard to the densely populated Pandacan. Several fires have been attributed to the presence of the oil depot and terrorist attacks were a major concern.

Difficulty in finding a reasonable relocation site for the depots, without disturbing the national distribution process of fuel, resulted in a compromise in place of the eviction. However, a gradual phase out of large oil tanks that lined residential areas has been completed and a Pandacan Linear Park was built along the oil depot and residential units up to the banks of the Pasig River.

Beautification programs

Atienza spearheaded a beautification program and spruced up parks and recreational facilities. This included the Plaza Balagtas that sits atop the Estero de Beata in 2003 and the Ladislao Bonus Park in 2006.

In September 2006, as part of Atienza's sidewalk redevelopment and street lighting program, the main highway from the corner of Jesus Street and Quirino Avenue at the foot of Nagtahan Bridge southwards into Palumpong Street and the whole of Laura Street up to the foot of the Padre Zamora Bridge was renovated, linking the walkways into the Pandacan Linear Park, a buffer zone made into a park separating the oil distribution facilities from the residential-commercial areas. The Pandacan Linear Park, developed under the support of the big three oil companies and the city government of Manila, allows for a leisure walk and recreational activities along the Pasig River.

Modern housing
Sections of the district are seeing improvements with a low-cost housing development in the site of the compound of the Manila City Engineer's Office beside the Nagtahan Bridge called "Residencias de Manila".

Tourism and events
Manila boasts its rich cultural history every year in Pandacan with the traditional "Buling Buling" Dance Festival. Because many of the country's literary and musical geniuses of the 19th century came from Pandacan, an annual traditional dancing in the streets of Pandacan is featured every Saturday before the main celebrations for the feast of the Santo Niño every third week of January.

See also
 Culture of the Philippines
 Places of interest in Pandacan
 Demographic history of the Philippines
 Languages of the Philippines
 Timeline of Philippine history

References

By Sword and Fire: The Destruction of Manila in World War II, 3 February-3 March 1945 by Alphonso J. Aluit (1994) Bookmark, Inc. © 1994 National Commission for Culture and the Arts 
.
.
.

External links
 Official Website of Manila
 Manila Photos

 
Districts of Manila